Xiaolongkan is a station on Line 1 and  Line 9 of Chongqing Rail Transit in Shapingba District, Chongqing Municipality, China. It opened in 2011.

Station structure

Line 1

Line 9

References

Railway stations in China opened in 2011
Chongqing Rail Transit stations
Shapingba District